Waldron Junior-Senior High School is a public high school located in Waldron, Indiana.

Athletics
Waldron Junior-Senior High School's athletic teams are the Mohawks and they compete in the Mid-Hoosier Conference. The school offers a wide range of athletics including:

Baseball
Basketball (Men's and Women's)
Cheerleading
Cross Country (Men's and Women's)
Golf
Gymnastics
Softball
Tennis (Men's and Women's)
Track and field (Men's and Women's)
Volleyball

Basketball
The 2003-2004 Men's basketball team won the IHSAA 1A State Championship defeating Blackhawk Christian School (Fort Wayne) by a score of 69-54

The Waldron Lady mohawks basketball team competed in the 2019 sectional 60 finals. The game lasted the regulated time and went into 5 overtimes making this game the longest girls basketball game in ihsaa girls history.

See also
 List of high schools in Indiana

References

External links
 Official website

Buildings and structures in Shelby County, Indiana
Schools in Shelby County, Indiana
Public middle schools in Indiana
Public high schools in Indiana